October is a self-hosted content management system (CMS) based on the PHP programming language and Laravel web application framework. It supports MySQL, SQLite and PostgreSQL for the database backend and uses a flat file database for the front end structure. The October CMS covers a range of capabilities such as users, permissions, themes, and plugins, and is seen as a simpler alternative to WordPress.

The platform is intended to have a small learning curve and a template system easily manageable with version control systems. As of July 2021, October is the second-most starred PHP CMS repository hosted on GitHub and is 17th most popular on the Entire Internet in Open Source category. The platform won the CMS Critic People's Choice Award for Best Flat File CMS for 2018. The Dallas Museum of Art uses October CMS in their information kiosks

On April 12, 2021, October CMS transitioned from using an MIT License to a proprietary software model citing concerns over a lack of sustainability with the open-source model.

Features

October offers the following features, among others:

 Components, a key feature that are configurable building elements that can be attached to any page.
 Building an interface requires minimal programming.
 Flat files are used to serve the website structure.
 Includes an Ajax framework built in for back-end and front-end.
 Uses Twig as templating engine. This makes it possible to completely separate data from the templates.
 File manager with CDN support and image cropping.
 CSS and JavaScript assets can be combined and minified with just a single tag in the CMS templates.
 The whole setup is event-driven, which enables the user to hook into core or plugin processes and extend them.
 Updates and plugins are delivered with a package manager.
 Community-contributed extensions in the October CMS marketplace.
 The back-end is translated into 36 languages.

Ukraine cyberattacks

From the 13th to 14th of January 2022, a known vulnerability in October CMS was used to deface the Ministry of Education and Science, the Ministry of Foreign Affairs, the Cabinet of Ministers and other Ukrainian government websites as part of the 2022 Ukraine cyberattacks. The Ukrainian Ministry of Digital Transformation announced that there was no data leak. The vulnerabilities were fixed nearly a year before the attack, although not all sites were running the latest version. Ukrainian cybersecurity agencies said the attack involved exploitation of CVE-2021-32648, a vulnerability in the October CMS, as well as the exploitation of the notorious Log4Shell flaw, and DDoS attacks.

See also

 Content management system
 List of content management systems

References

Content management systems
Formerly free software